Guanine nucleotide-binding protein G(I)/G(S)/G(O) subunit gamma-7 is a protein that in humans is encoded by the GNG7 gene.

Interactions 

GNG7 has been shown to interact with GNB5.

References

Further reading